Goodbye Bafana, or The Color of Freedom (US), is a 2007 drama film, directed by Bille August, about the relationship between Nelson Mandela (Dennis Haysbert) and James Gregory (Joseph Fiennes), his censor officer and prison guard, based on Gregory's book Goodbye Bafana: Nelson Mandela, My Prisoner, My Friend. The film also explores the relationship of James Gregory and his wife as their life changes while Mandela is under Gregory's watch.

Bafana means 'boys'. Gregory lived on a farm and had a black friend when he was a child, which explains his ability  to speak Xhosa.

Plot
The young revolutionary Nelson Mandela is arrested, and it is the task of censor James Gregory to watch him. He has long since moved to South Africa with the family for his work in the prison of Robben Island, and slowly he clashes with the politics and racist culture of his countrymen.

Cast

 Joseph Fiennes as James Gregory
 Dennis Haysbert as Nelson Mandela
 Diane Kruger as Gloria Gregory
 Norman Anstey as Jimmy Kruger
 Faith Ndukwana as Winnie Mandela
 Terry Pheto as Zindzi Mandela
 Zikhona Mda as Zenani Mandela
 Leslie Mongezi as Walter Sisulu
 Zingizile Mtuzula as Raymond Mhlaba
 Mehboob Bawa as Ahmed Kathrada
 Shakes Myeko as Andrew Mlangeni
 Sizwe Msutu as Cyril Ramaphosa

Factual basis
The autobiography film was based on, Goodbye Bafana: Nelson Mandela, My Prisoner, My Friend, was derided by Mandela's longtime friend, the late Anthony Sampson. In Sampson's book Mandela: the Authorised Biography he accused James Gregory, who died of cancer in 2003, of lying and violating Mandela's privacy in his work Goodbye Bafana. Sampson said that Gregory had rarely spoken to Mandela, but censored the letters sent to the prisoner and used this information to fabricate a close relationship with him. Sampson also claimed that other warders suspected Gregory of spying for the government, and that Mandela considered suing Gregory.

Writing in The Guardian, critic and historian Alex von Tunzelmann, stated that the film was a "dubious tale" of Nelson Mandela's imprisonment based on his prison guard's memoirs, and that it was a story that contradicted all other known accounts of his time in prison. She went on to say that there was no excuse for the "historical negligence in this movie", while stating that its implicit dismissal of the contradictory accounts of Nelson Mandela and others could be seen as insulting.

In his own autobiography, Long Walk to Freedom, Nelson Mandela mentions James Gregory on two occasions. The first is during Mandela's recollection of his incarceration in Pollsmoor Prison:
 
The second time Mandela mentions Gregory in his autobiography is when he recalls the day of his release from prison in 1990:

On the Goodbye Bafana DVD, a segment about the creation of the film, The Making of Goodbye Bafana, contains an interview with Nelson Mandela where he speaks of James Gregory:

References

External links
 
 
 BBC news, 12 February 2007: Mandela movie launches in Berlin Retrieved 2012-07-10

2007 films
2000s biographical films
Belgian biographical films
British biographical films
French biographical films
German biographical films
Italian biographical films
Luxembourgian drama films
South African biographical films
2000s English-language films
English-language Belgian films
English-language French films
English-language German films
English-language Italian films
English-language Luxembourgian films
English-language South African films
Xhosa-language films
Apartheid films
Films scored by Dario Marianelli
Films about Nelson Mandela
Cultural depictions of Nelson Mandela
Cultural depictions of Winnie Mandela
Films about Nobel laureates
Films based on biographies
Films directed by Bille August
Films set in the 1960s
Films set in the 1970s
Films set in the 1980s
Films set in prison
Films set in South Africa
Films set on islands
Films shot in South Africa
2000s British films
2000s French films
2000s German films
2007 multilingual films
Belgian multilingual films
British multilingual films
French multilingual films
German multilingual films
Italian multilingual films
Luxembourgian multilingual films
South African multilingual films